The 2008 McDonald's All-American Boys Game was an All-star basketball game played on Wednesday, March 26, 2008 at the Bradley Center in Milwaukee, Wisconsin, home of the NBA's Milwaukee Bucks. The game's rosters featured the best and most highly recruited high school boys graduating in 2008.  The game was the 31st annual version of the McDonald's All-American Game first played in 1978.

The 48 players were selected from 2,500 nominees by a committee of basketball experts. They were chosen not only for their on-court skills, but for their performances off the court as well. Coach Morgan Wootten, who had more than 1,200 wins as head basketball coach at DeMatha High School, was
chairman of the selection committee. Legendary UCLA coach John Wooden, who has been involved in the McDonald's All American Games since its inception, served as chairman of the Games and as an advisor to the selection committee.

Proceeds from the 2008 McDonald's All American High School Basketball Games went to Ronald McDonald House Charities (RMHC) of Eastern Wisconsin and its Ronald McDonald House program.

2008 Game
The game was telecast live by ESPN.  Nearly 11,000 fans filled the Bradley Center and witnessed a closely contested 107-102 victory by the visiting East Team. The victory widened the East’s lead in the overall series to 17-14 and stopped a two-game winning streak by the West Team.

The John R. Wooden MVP Award was given to Tyreke Evans (Memphis), as he led the East squad in both points (21) and rebounds (10).  Mike Rosario (Rutgers) contributed 18 points and five steals. That steal total earned Rasario a tie for fifth place all-time in the record books.

Willie Warren (Oklahoma) led the West Team with 23 points on 65% shooting from the field.  Brandon Jennings had a solid game with 12 points, five rebounds and nine assists, which placed him in the 10th spot all-time. Both teams featured a balanced attack where twelve players total scored in double figures (Brandon Jennings, Jrue Holiday, DeMar DeRozan, B.J. Mullens, Willie Warren and Anthony Smith for the West) and (Tyreke Evans, Kemba Walker, Mike Rosario, Elliot Williams, Ed Davis and JaMychal Green for the East).   The West Team also featured this year's Morgan Wootten Player of the Year and the Naismith Sportsmanship Award winners, Greg Monroe (Georgetown) and Luke Babbitt (Nevada) respectively.

This game looked to be a great match-up from the tip.  The teams traded buckets and had three ties and four lead changes within the first three
minutes of the game. However, the East Team grabbed the lead at 8-6 and kept it the remainder of the game. The West Squad fought hard to keep the lead to single digits and had it down to a two-point game late in the second period, but they couldn’t overcome a 14 rebound deficit and 52% shooting from the East Team.

East Roster

West Roster

 Rosario left Rutgers after his sophomore season of 2009–10 and transferred to Florida. He completed his eligibility at Florida in 2013.
 Opted to accept a contract in Rome, Italy instead of attending a US university.

Coaches
The East team was coached by:
 Head Coach Woodie Jackson of Francis Marion High School (Marion, Alabama)
 Asst Coach Anthony Trimble of Francis Marion High School (Marion, Alabama)
 Asst Coach Albert Turner Jr. of Francis Marion High School (Marion, Alabama)

The West team was coached by:
 Co-Head Coach Tom Diener of Harold S. Vincent High School (Milwaukee, Wisconsin)
 Co-Head Coach Jim Gosz of Rufus King High School (Milwaukee, Wisconsin)
 Asst Coach Marc Mitchell of Custer High School (Milwaukee, Wisconsin)

Boxscore

Visitors: East

Home: West

(* = Starting Line-up)

All-American Week

Schedule

 Tuesday, March 25: Powerade Jamfest
 Slam Dunk Contest
 Three-Point Shoot-out
 Timed Basketball Skills Competition
 Wednesday, March 26: 31st Annual Boys All-American Game

The Powerade JamFest is a skills-competition evening featuring basketball players who demonstrate their skills in three crowd-entertaining ways.  The slam dunk contest was first held in 1987, and a 3-point shooting challenge was added in 1989.  This year, for the first time, a timed basketball skills competition was added to the schedule of events.

Contest Winners
 The 2008 Powerade Slam Dunk contest was won by DeMar DeRozan.
 Larry Drew II was winner of the 2008 3-point shoot-out.
 The skills competition was won by Jrue Holiday.

See also
 2008 McDonald's All-American Girls Game

References

External links
McDonald's All-American on the web

2007–08 in American basketball
2008
2008 in sports in Wisconsin
Basketball competitions in Milwaukee